State Route 243 (SR 243) is an east–west state highway in the southern portion of the U.S. state of Ohio. The western terminus of SR 243 is at a diamond interchange with the U.S. Route 52 (US 52) in Coal Grove.

History
SR 243 between SR 7, in Proctorville, and SR 7 northeast of Proctorville, was signed in 1923 as SR 219. In 1925, SR 219 was replaced by SR 243. This section of road was paved in 1929. The western terminus was moved west to Coal Grove, concurrent with SR 7 through Proctorville, in 1932. The paving of the route between Coal Grove and Proctorville was completed by 1955. On December 11, 2006, SR 243 was truncated to its present location following completion of the new SR 775 by-pass of Proctorville, which SR 7 was re-routed onto, leaving jurisdiction of the former routings of SR 7 and SR 243 through Proctorville to be turned over from the state to the local jurisdictions.

Major intersections

References

243
Transportation in Lawrence County, Ohio